UHSN (Hangul/Chosongul: 유학소녀; RR: Yuhagsonyeo; Hanja: 留學少女; lit. Study Abroad Girl) was a Korean reality show produced by Mnet. 10 international female K-pop fans were invited to Korea to learn about Korean popular music, culture, cuisine and history for 3 weeks. In conjunction with the 7th episode, a single titled "Popsicle" was released on July 4. A music video for the aforementioned single was premiered at the end of the final episode on July 11.

Participants

Episodes

Discography 
Credits taken from Melon.

References

External links 

 Official website
 Music video "POPSICLE"

K-pop television series
South Korean reality television series
Mnet (TV channel) original programming
Korean-language television shows
Multiculturalism in South Korea